Auzata semipavonaria is a moth in the family Drepanidae. It was described by Francis Walker in 1863. It is found in northern India.

The wingspan is 38-51.2 mm for males and 45.2-51.4 mm for females. Adults are similar to Auzata chinensis, but there are no black scales on the anterior part of the comma-shaped marking on the upperside of the forewings.

References

Moths described in 1863
Drepaninae
Moths of Asia